The southern white-fringed antwren (Formicivora grisea) is an insectivorous bird in the antbird family Thamnophilidae. It is a resident breeder in tropical South America from Colombia southeast to the Guianas and  Brazil.

Taxonomy
The southern white-fringed antwren was described by the French polymath Georges-Louis Leclerc, Comte de Buffon in his Histoire Naturelle des Oiseaux in 1775 from a specimen collected in Cayenne, French Guiana. The bird was also illustrated in a hand-coloured plate engraved by François-Nicolas Martinet in the Planches Enluminées D'Histoire Naturelle which was produced under the supervision of Edme-Louis Daubenton to accompany Buffon's text. Neither the plate caption nor Buffon's description included a scientific name but in 1783 the Dutch naturalist Pieter Boddaert coined the binomial name Turdus griseus in his catalogue of the Planches Enluminées. The southern white-fringed antwren is now placed in the genus Formicivora that was introduced by the English naturalist William Swainson in 1824.  The generic name combines the Latin words formica for "ant" and -vorus "eating" from vorare "to devour". The specific epithet grisea is from the Medieval Latin griseus meaning "grey".

The northern white-fringed antwren (Formicivora intermedia) was previously considered as a subspecies of the southern white-fringed antwren but is now separated as a separate species based on differences in the vocalizations.

Two subspecies are recognised:
 F. g. rufiventris Carriker, 1936 – east Colombia and south Venezuela
 F. g. grisea (Boddaert, 1783) – the Guianas and east Brazil

Description
The male has a grey-brown crown and upperparts, and black wings, tail, lower face and underparts. There are two conspicuous white wing bars and a white stripe running from above the eye down the sides of the breast and flanks. The tail feathers are tipped with white. The female's upperparts are much like the male, but females of the southern populations are orange below and have an orange supercilium. These occur south and east from southeastern Colombia and southernmost Venezuela. Northern population's females have underparts which are buff with dark streaks.

It has a tu whistle followed by a trilled churet, and a repeated and accelerating tu-ik call. Southern birds also have a repetitive chump-chump-chump song, quite unlike the northern white-fringed antwren (Formicivora intermedia).

Distribution and habitat
This is a common and confiding bird of second growth woodland, usually found as territorial pairs. The southern populations are associated with scrubby bushes on white sandy soils and restinga habitat. These birds inhabit the lowlands, up to around 200 m ASL. In some places, they are sympatric with the rusty-backed antwren (F. rufa). The white-fringed antwren feeds on small insects and other arthropods taken from undergrowth twigs and foliage.

Behavior
The female lays two purple-marked creamy white eggs, which are incubated by both sexes, in a grass hammock nest low in a tree or shrub. Nests are occasionally plundered by predators, for example smallish mammals like the common marmoset (Callithrix jacchus), despite the birds' attempts to defend their offspring.

Of a total of 13 birds studied in Colombia—in the Parque Nacional de La Macarena and near Turbo—only one was infected with blood parasites (an undetermined Plasmodium species).

Status
This bird is not considered globally threatened by the IUCN. However, its resilience to human alteration of habitat is not too pronounced, and in some regions its continuing presence would seem to depend on protection of habitat.

Footnotes

References

 Basto, Natalia; Rodríguez, Oscar A.; Marinkelle, Cornelis J.; Gutierrez, Rafael & Matta, Nubia Estela (2006): Haematozoa in birds from la Macarena National Natural Park (Colombia). Caldasia 28 (2): 371–377 [English with Spanish abstract]. PDF fulltext
 de Lyra-Neves, Rachel M.; Oliveira, Maria A. B.;  Telino-Júnior,Wallace R. & dos Santos, Ednilza M. (2007): Comportamentos interespecíficos entre Callithrix jacchus (Linnaeus) (Primates, Callitrichidae) e algumas aves de Mata Atlântica, Pernambuco, Brasil [Interspecific behaviour between Callithrix jacchus (Linnaeus) (Callitrichidae, Primates) and some birds of the Atlantic forest, Pernanbuco State, Brazil]. Revista Brasileira de Zoologia 24 (3): 709–716 [Portuguese with English abstract].  PDF fulltext.
 Londono, Aurora; Pulgarin-R., Paulo C. & Blair, Silva (2007): Blood Parasites in Birds From the Lowlands of Northern Colombia. Caribbean Journal of Science 43 (1): 87–93. PDF fulltext
 Venturini, Ana Cristina & de Paz, Pedro Rogerio (2005): Observações sobre a distribuição geográfica de Formicivora spp. (Aves: Thamnophilidae), no Estado do Espírito Santo, sudeste do Brasil. Revista Brasileira de Ornitologia 13 (2): 169–175. PDF fulltext

External links
 Xeno-canto: audio recordings of the southern white-fringed antwren
 Formicivora grisea photos on Flickr

Formicivora
Birds of Colombia
Birds of Venezuela
Birds of the Guianas
Birds of the Atlantic Forest
Birds of Brazil
Birds of Trinidad and Tobago
Birds described in 1783